The 2022 U.S. F2000 National Championship will be the thirteenth season of the U.S. F2000 National Championship since its revival in 2010. The championship serves as the first rung of the IndyCar Series's Road to Indy ladder system. An 18 race schedule was announced on October 5, 2021 featuring five permanent road courses, two street circuits, and a single oval in the Lucas Oil Indianapolis Raceway Park.

Michael d'Orlando won the championship after surpassing both Myles Rowe and Jace Denmark in championship points during the final race of the season.

Drivers and teams

Schedule

Race results

Championship standings

Drivers' Championship
Scoring system

 The driver who qualifies on pole is awarded one additional point.
 One point is awarded to the driver who leads the most laps in a race.
 One point is awarded to the driver who sets the fastest lap during the race.

See also 

 2022 IndyCar Series
 2022 Indy Lights
 2022 Indy Pro 2000 Championship
 2022 USF Juniors

References 

US F2000
US F2000
US F2000
U.S. F2000 National Championship seasons